The Philippine fairy-bluebird (Irena cyanogastra) is a species of bird in the family Irenidae. It is endemic to the Philippines being found in the islands of Luzon, Mindanao, Samar and Bohol.

Its natural habitats are  tropical moist lowland forest and tropical moist montane forest. They are seen in mixed flocks along with Philippine bulbuls, Blue-headed fantails and other forest birds. It is threatened by habitat loss and hunting for both food and pet trade.

Mythology 

This species is considered as sacred to the Tagalog people as this is perceived as tigmamanukan omen, and therefore, the sacred omen and messenger of Bathala, the supreme god in indigenous Tagalog religious practices.

In old Tagalog mythology in southern Luzon (Philippines), the Philippine fairy-bluebirds were known as the tigmamanukan omen birds. All of which were the omen birds of Bathala, the supreme god of the Tagalog people prior to the arrival of the Spanish. According to legend, Bathala ordered a tigmamanukan bird to crack in one peck the bamboo which let out the first man, Malakas, and first woman, Maganda. In another legend, Bathala also sends the tigmamanukan bird (sometimes the tigmamanukan snake or lizard as there are three tigmamanukan forms) to aid mankind if they need to proceed or halt a journey.  If a traveler sees a tigmamanukan omen, and it passes from right to left, then it symbolizes as labay (Bathala's approval to proceed with the journey). If the tigmamanukan omen passes from left to right, the traveller should not proceed, or else he or she will never return. All tigmamanukan omen birds are said to live in the mythical Mount Batala (a sacred mountain of Bathala).

See also
Asian fairy-bluebird

References

External links
Image at ADW

Philippine fairy-bluebird
Endemic birds of the Philippines
Philippine fairy-bluebird
Taxonomy articles created by Polbot